Mysuru Warriors—formerly known as the Mysure Warriors—are one-time champions of the Karnataka Premier League Cricket League, a Karnataka-based T-20 competition. Mysuru Warriors, with a tagline of "Ditta Nade, Spashta Guri" translating to "Strong steps towards a clear goal". The team is owned by N Ranga Rao & Sons Pvt. Ltd., and is captained by Jagadeesha Suchith. Further notable players include Manish Pandey.

Cricket teams in India
Cricket in Karnataka
Karnataka Premier League